Princess Nadezhda of Bulgaria (born Nadezhda Klementine Maria Pia Majella (Надежда Клементина Мария Пия Мажелла)); ; 30 January 1899 – 15 February 1958) was a member of the Bulgarian Royal Family.

Life

She was born in Sofia as the youngest daughter of Ferdinand I of Bulgaria and his first wife Princess Marie Louise of Parma who died giving birth to her. Along with her sister Princess Eudoxia she was educated under the direction of their step mother, Princess Eleonore Reuss of Köstritz.

Princess Nadezhda was married on 24 January 1924 at Bad Mergentheim, Germany, to Duke Albrecht Eugen of Württemberg (8 January 1895 Stuttgart – 24 June 1954 Schwäbisch Gmünd) the second son of Albrecht, Duke of Württemberg. They had five children.

 Duke Ferdinand Eugen (3 April 1925 – 3 November 2020).
 Duchess Margareta Luise (25 November 1928 – 10 June 2017) married François Luce-Bailly, Viscount of Chevigny (15 June 1923 – 6 March 2022) on August 8, 1970. They have one son.
 Duke Eugen Eberhard (2 November 1930 – 26 July 2022) married in 1962 (div 1972) Archduchess Alexandra of Austria (b. 21 May 1935), daughter of Princess Ileana of Romania and had no issue.
 Duke Alexander Eugen (b. 5 March 1933)
 Duchess Sophie (b. 16 February 1937) married in 1969 (div 1974) Antonio Manuel Rôxo de Ramos-Bandeira (2 August 1937 – 23 February 1987)

Princess Nadezhda died aged 59 in Stuttgart, Germany.

Literature
 Hans-Joachim Böttcher: Ferdinand von Sachsen-Coburg und Gotha 1861–1948: Ein Kosmopolit auf dem bulgarischen Thron. Osteuropazentrum-Berlin-Verlag (Anthea-Verlagsgruppe), Berlin 2019, pp. 392–393 a.o.

Arms

Ancestors

References

1899 births
1958 deaths
Nobility from Sofia
Bulgarian princesses
House of Saxe-Coburg and Gotha (Bulgaria)
Princesses of Saxe-Coburg and Gotha
Duchesses of Württemberg
Daughters of kings